American group Chic released a number of albums in the period 1977 to 1983. After 1983's Believer the group did not record a studio album until 1992's Chic-Ism. The band has since continued to tour and release live and compilation albums. The group's first studio album in 26 years, titled It's About Time was released in September 2018. Nile Rodgers and Bernard Edwards produced for a series of artists in the years 1978 to 1982. They sometimes produced under the name 'The Chic Organization'.

Albums

Studio albums

Live albums
Live at the Budokan (1999)
A Night in Amsterdam (2006)

Compilation albums
Charting compilations

* Compilation albums chart.

Complete list
Les Plus Grands Succès De Chic: Chic's Greatest Hits (1979, Atlantic Records)
Freak Out: The Greatest Hits of Chic and Sister Sledge (1988, Atlantic Records/WEA)
Megachic: Best of Chic (1990, Warner Music/Atlantic Records)
Dance, Dance, Dance: The Best of Chic (1991, Atlantic Records/Rhino Records/Warner Music), BPI: Silver
The Best of Chic, Volume 2 (1992, Atlantic Records/Rhino Records/Warner Music)
Everybody Dance (1995, Rhino Records/Warner Music)
Chic Freak and More Treats (1996, A440 Music Group)
Dance, Dance, Dance & Other Hits (1997, Rhino Records/Warner Music)
The Very Best of Chic & Sister Sledge (1999, Rhino Records/Warner Music)
The Very Best of Chic (2000, Rhino Records/Warner Music)
Good Times: The Very Best of the Hits & the Remixes (Chic & Sister Sledge) (2005, Warner Music)
The Definitive Groove Collection (2006, Rhino Records/Warner Music), BPI: Silver
Nile Rodgers presents The Chic Organization: Vol.1 Savoir Faire (box set, 2010, Rhino Records, reissued 2013)
Original Album Series: Chic + C'est Chic + Risqué + Real People + Take It Off (2011, Rhino Records/Atlantic Records)
Magnifique: The Very Best of Chic (2011, Music Club Deluxe)
Nile Rodgers presents The Chic Organization: Up All Night (2013, Rhino Records)

All of the combined Chic and Sister Sledge compilations also contain some Sister Sledge material without Chic's involvement. The two "Nile Rodgers presents The Chic Organization" collections contain "Chic Organization" productions for other artists alongside Chic's own material.

Singles

As featured performer

 "Happy Together" is written and played by Rodgers and Edwards, with regular Chic member Robert Sabino also appearing, but produced by Jimmy Douglass. 
 "Sensitivity" samples an unreleased Chic track, "Love and Be Loved", with additional guitar by Rodgers.

Artists produced by Chic

Albums

The title of the Fonzi Thornton album is given by several websites as Frostbite, though there is no known official source for this.

The core members of Chic (Edwards, Rodgers and Thompson, together with keyboard player Robert Sabino) also performed together on Madonna's 1984 album Like a Virgin, which was produced by Rodgers, though it is not officially a Chic Organization work.

Singles

References

External links

Rhythm and blues discographies
Pop music group discographies
Funk music discographies
Disco discographies